Lordville may refer to:
 Lordville, Minnesota, an unincorporated community in Lowville Township, Minnesota, US
 Lordville, New York, a hamlet in Hancock Township, New York, US
 Lordville–Equinunk Bridge or Lordville Suspension Bridge, a bridge over the Delaware River

See also

 Lordstown (disambiguation)
 Lordsburg (disambiguation)